In mathematics, hyperbolic trigonometry can mean:

The study of  hyperbolic triangles in hyperbolic geometry (traditional trigonometry is the study of triangles in plane geometry)
The use of the hyperbolic functions
The use of gyrotrigonometry in hyperbolic geometry